"Conquer Your House" is a 1991 single by Excessive Force, a side project of KMFDM and My Life with the Thrill Kill Kult.  It was released prior to the album Conquer Your World, and was included on that album's re-release in 2007.

Track listing

Personnel
 Sascha Konietzko
 Buzz McCoy

References

1991 singles
Excessive Force songs
1991 songs
Wax Trax! Records singles
Songs written by Sascha Konietzko